In Norse mythology, the Horses of the Æsir are ridden by the gods. They are mentioned in the Poetic Edda and the Prose Edda.

Listing
The horses of the Æsir are listed twice.

The Eddic poem Grímnismál gives the following names:

Snorri Sturluson paraphrases this stanza in his Gylfaginning:

Apart from Sleipnir, Odin's eight-legged horse, and Gulltoppr, who belongs to Heimdallr according to the Prose Edda, nothing is known about these horses, especially their owner. These names are yet listed in the þulur.

Other horses are mentioned elsewhere: Gullfaxi, which originally belonged to Hrungnir, but who was given by Thor to his son Magni after he killed the giant (Skáldskaparmál, 17), Blóðughófi, which belongs to Freyr (Kálfsvísa) and Hófvarpnir, which is ridden by Gná (Gylfaginning, 35).

Meanings
 Blóðughófi: "Bloody-hoof";
 Falhófnir: "Hairy-hoof" or "Hidden-hoof", i.e. whose hoofs are covered with hair, or "Pale-hoof";
 Gulltoppr: "Gold-tuft";
 Gísl: related to "beam", "ray";
 Glaðr: "Glad" or "Bright";
 Glær: "Clear", "Glassy";
 Gullfaxi: "Golden-mane"
 Gyllir: "Golden";
 Hófvarpnir : "Hoof-thrower";
 Léttfeti: "Light-foot";
 Silfrintoppr: "Silver-tuft";
 Sinir: "Sinewy";
 Skeiðbrimir: "the one which snorts as he runs";
 Sleipnir: "trickster";

See also
Second Merseburg Charm, in which the gods heal a hurt horse
List of fictional horses

Notes

Aesir
Æsir